Hartsel is a census-designated place (CDP) and post office in and governed by Park County, Colorado United States. The Hartsel post office has the ZIP Code 80449. At the United States Census 2010, the population of the 80449 ZIP Code Tabulation Area was 909 including adjacent areas. The CDP is a part of the Denver–Aurora–Lakewood, CO Metropolitan Statistical Area.

History
Founded in 1880, Hartsel is close to the geographic center of the state, and is often referred to as "The Heart of Colorado". The namesake of the community is Samuel Hartsel, a local farmer and cattle rancher who came to Park County in 1860 and left in 1908. He developed the Hartsel hot springs and built a sawmill, blacksmith shop, and a trading post to lay the groundwork for the town.

Geography

Climate
According to the Köppen climate classification system, Hartsel has a Cold Semi-arid climate (BSk).

Summers are warm with chilly nights in the 30s and 40s (°F) and some thunderstorm activity during the months of July and August. Winters are cold and dry with lows below zero.  A climate writeup consisting of interpolated data is below.

Ecology
According to the A. W. Kuchler U.S. Potential natural vegetation Types, Hartsel would have a Wheatgrass / Needlegrass (66) vegetation type and a North Mixed grass prairie (7) vegetation form.

See also

 List of census-designated places in Colorado

References

External links

 Hartsel @ Colorado.com
  Hartsel @ UncoverColorado.com
 Hartsel @ Sangres.com
 Hartsel @ GhostTowns.com
 Hartsel Area Historic Sites
 Park County website

Unincorporated communities in Park County, Colorado
Unincorporated communities in Colorado